Senegalese Red Cross Society was established by decree in 1962. It has its headquarters in Dakar.

Despite being a Muslim majority nation, it uses the Red Cross as its symbol for the society.

External links
 Senegal Red Cross Profile
 Official Website of the Senegalese Red Cross Society

Red Cross and Red Crescent national societies
1962 establishments in Senegal
Organizations established in 1962
Medical and health organisations based in Senegal